Wilton is a village in the province of Mashonaland East, Zimbabwe. It is located about 35 km south of Marondera. It serves as a commercial centre for the Soswe communal land.

Populated places in Mashonaland East Province